The Ambala Air Force Station is an Air Force base situated north of the urban Ambala Cantt area in Haryana, India. The Ambala Air Force Station is the home to the first batch of advance multirole fighter jet Dassault Rafales that have been inducted to Indian Air Force.

Location

Ambala Air Force Station is considered one of the most strategically located bases of the IAF. The Indo-Pak border is around 220 km from there.

History

In 1919, first airstrip was built in Haryana when Ambala Air Force Station was established following the independence of India. It is also the home to the SEPECAT Jaguar of No. 5 Squadron IAF and No. 14 Squadron IAF, and aging MiG-21bis of No. 21 Squadron IAF.

In 1919, a Flying Instruction School (FIS) was formed here.

In 1947, FIS Ambala was moved to Tambaram near Chennai in Tamil Nadu, at Tambaram Air Force Station.

In both the 1965 and 1971 wars, Ambala Air Force Base was attacked by the Pakistani Air Force. In 1965, the Pakistanis struck Ambala and reportedly destroyed some 25 Indian planes just after they had returned from missions (the PAF did not initially claimed any IAF aircraft during the attack on Ambala due to non-availability of damage in night bombing).
Indian Air Force rejected the Pakistani claim and stated that no aircraft were lost in Ambala during the war.

In January 2019, it was announced to set up a civil enclave and extend runway of all five existing government airports in Haryana to at least 5,000 feet for midsize aircraft and business jets, and night landing and parking hangars will be constructed as airlines have approached the Haryana government to park their spillover "Non-scheduled Air Operations" (NSOP) aircraft from the congested IGI airport at Delhi to Bhiwani and Narnaul airport. Some of this development work at Hisar, Bhiwani and Narnaul airports is already underway. Hisar will be extended to 10,000 ft by March 2022 for large air crafts.

On Feb 26, 2019, for India's 2019 Balakot airstrike in Pakistan, Mirage fighters took off from the Ambala air base, and the whole operation took 30 minutes.

During 2020-21 covid pandemic, MChS Rossii flew to Ambala with relief supplies from Russia.

Assets
In 2018–19, Ambala Airforce station housed a squadron of SEPECAT Jaguar. in May 2020, the IAF became the house of the first batch of 36 latest Dassault Rafale fighter jets at Ambala Air Force Station and Hasimara Air Force Station.

See also

 List of airports in India by state
 Airports Authority of India
 List of busiest airports in India
 List of Indian Air Force bases
 Military
 Sirsa Air Force Station
 Gurugram Air Force Station
 Raja Nahar Singh Faridabad Air Force Logistics Station
 Hisar Military Station
 List of Indian Air Force bases
 List of Armed Forces Hospitals In India
 Other
 Divisions of Haryana
 List of highways in Haryana
 Railway in Haryana

References

Ambala
Indian Air Force bases
Airports in Haryana
World War II sites in India
1940s establishments in India
Airports established in the 1940s
20th-century architecture in India